Sociedad Deportiva Ordes is a Spanish football team based in Ordes, in the autonomous community of Galicia. Founded in 1953 it plays in Tercera División – Group 1, holding home games at Estadio Vista Alegre, which has a capacity of 3,000 spectators.

Season to season

22 seasons in Tercera División

Notable players

 Manny Aparicio
 Dejan Djermanović

External links
Official website 
Futbolme team profile 

Football clubs in Galicia (Spain)
Association football clubs established in 1953
1953 establishments in Spain